The following lists events that happened during 1981 in the Republic of Palau.

Events
 January 1 – Palau was proclaimed in the Palau Islands of Micronesia.

 
Years of the 20th century in Palau
1980s in Palau
Palau
Palau